Live in London is a Judas Priest DVD, released on 23 July 2002 by SPV. It was recorded live on 19 December 2001 at the Brixton Academy in London. Not all songs are featured but the full concert is available as a live album, released in 2003.

Track listing

Extras
 Demolition Time
 Soundcheck
 Rare backstage footage
 Interviews

Personnel
Tim 'Ripper' Owens - vocals
K.K. Downing - guitar
Glenn Tipton - guitar
Ian Hill - bass
Scott Travis - drums

References

Judas Priest video albums
2002 video albums
Live video albums
2002 live albums